Urganda is a mythological witch, the Portuguese equivalent of Circe, the witch that Odysseus is said  to have encountered on his journey home from  Troy.  She is an enchantress in the romances belonging to the Amadis and Paimerin series, in the Spanish school of romance.

Urganda is one of the Fates who appear in Matteo Maria Boiardo's epic poem  ''Orlando in Love '' (1495). In the poem she is the protector of Amadigi along with fellow fate Oriana.

The Spanish poet Miguel Cervantes mentions her in the preliminary Poems of Don Quixote (1605) .  The part she plays in the poem  is more like that of Merlin. She derives her title from the faculty which, like Merlin, she possessed of changing her form and appearance at will.

A hermitage folly designed in 1750 by Thomas Wright  in the grounds of Badminton House , in Gloucestershire , England, and known as the Root House  is dedicated to her.

References 

Circe
Portuguese mythology
Witches in folklore